Sedum stenopetalum is a species of flowering plant in the family Crassulaceae known by the common name wormleaf stonecrop, or golden constellation. It is native to western North America from British Columbia and Alberta to northern California to Wyoming. It can be found in many types of rocky habitat, such as cliffs, talus, and steep ridges. It is a succulent plant producing mats or clumps of lance-shaped, linear, or three-lobed leaves each under 2 centimeters long. The inflorescence is a short, erect array of one to many flowers with lance-shaped petals up to a centimeter long. The petals are yellow, sometimes with red veins.

References

External links

Jepson Manual Treatment
USDA Plants Profile
Flora of North America
Washington Burke Museum
Photo gallery

stenopetalum